Pacolet Mills Cloth Room and Warehouse is a historic textile mill located at Pacolet, Spartanburg County, South Carolina. It was built in 1906–1907, and consists the 1 1/2-story, brick cloth building with the attached warehouse portion covered with weatherboard and metal. the building features a low-profiled roof and large rounded arch windows. The front portion of the building was used for inspecting cloth prior to shipping, and the rear portion was used as a warehouse.

It was listed on the National Register of Historic Places in 2006.

References

External links
Pacolet Mills community website

Industrial buildings and structures on the National Register of Historic Places in South Carolina
Industrial buildings completed in 1907
Buildings and structures in Spartanburg County, South Carolina
National Register of Historic Places in Spartanburg County, South Carolina
Warehouses on the National Register of Historic Places
Cotton mills in the United States